Yiwu Meihu Sports Centre is a multi-purpose stadium in Yiwu, Jinhua, Zhejiang, China. The Yiwu Meihu Stadium holds 35,260 spectators and is mainly used for association football matches. The Meihu Arena holds 6,000 spectators and is mainly used for basketball games.

References 

Football venues in China
Multi-purpose stadiums in China